Joe Michael Clarke (born 26 May 1996) is an English cricketer who plays for Nottinghamshire County Cricket Club. He is a right-handed batsman who also plays as a wicket-keeper. He made his first-class debut for Worcestershire against Hampshire in May 2015. He was educated at Llanfyllin High School.  Following Worcestershire’s relegation to Division Two of the County Championship in 2018, he joined Nottinghamshire on a four year deal.

In 2017, Clarke was included in an England Lions squad that toured Australia, scoring 45 against a CA XI in Perth. However, in May 2019, the England and Wales Cricket Board (ECB) withdrew Clarke from the Lions' squad, after being named during Alex Hepburn's rape trial. Hepburn was found guilty of rape, and although the judge said that Clarke "did nothing wrong" on the night of the attack, the ECB were concerned about the disrespectful messages about women that had been exchanged. Messages sent by Clarke included, "No reheats allowed" and "Just bring a mattress. So if we do chop, it will have to be in your bed. Probably will chop … so we’ll have to just both chop in your bed like the good old days!”

On the 15th September 2018, Clarke was a part of the Worcestershire side that secured their maiden T20 Blast title as they went on to beat Lancashire and Sussex on finals day.

On the 21 June 2019, the English Cricket Board charged Joe Clarke and Tom Kohler-Cadmore with bringing the game into disrepute in relation to their participation in the group actions which saw Alex Hepburn found guilty of rape. On the 4 July 2019, both players pleaded guilty to the charge and were reprimanded and fined.

In December 2021, he was signed by the Karachi Kings following the players' draft for the 2022 Pakistan Super League. In April 2022, he was bought by the Welsh Fire for the 2022 season of The Hundred.

References

External links
 
 

1996 births
Living people
Sportspeople from Shrewsbury
People educated at Shrewsbury School
English cricketers
Worcestershire cricketers
North v South cricketers
Marylebone Cricket Club cricketers
Nottinghamshire cricketers
Shropshire cricketers
Perth Scorchers cricketers
Karachi Kings cricketers
Manchester Originals cricketers
Melbourne Stars cricketers
Wicket-keepers
Welsh Fire cricketers